Rockstar is the third album by Swedish pop singer Bosson. It was released in 2003 by MNW.

Track listing

References

2003 albums
Bosson albums